Beata Łaska z Kościeleckich  (1515-1576), was a Polish magnate heiress.  She was reputed to be the illegitimate daughter of king Sigismund I the Old.

She was the daughter of Andrzej Kościelecki and Katarzyna Telniczanka and married to Illia Ostrogski (d. 1539) in 1539, and Olbracht Łaski in 1564. She served as maid-of-honour to queen Bona Sforza prior to her marriage. She was the mother of Elizaveta Ostrogska.

She is known for her famous feud with her son-in-law. She married her second spouse to have an ally against her son-in-law, but instead, her husband stole her fortune, had her imprisoned and committed bigamy. The case became a scandal and was brought before the emperor in a famed court case in 1573.

References

 Nyka Józef: Beata Łaska – pierwsza turystka tatrzańska , w: "Wierchy" R. 29 (1960), wyd. Kraków 1961, s. 78-88.

16th-century Polish nobility
16th-century Polish women
1576 deaths
1515 births
Ostrogski family
16th-century Polish landowners